Coronet was a general interest digest magazine published from October 23, 1936, to at least March 1971 and ran for 299 issues. Coronet magazine continued publication under some form and ownership through at least September 1976, an issue with actress Angie Dickinson on the cover.  The magazine was owned by Esquire and published by David A. Smart from 1936 to 1961.

Typical issue
Each issue had a wide variety of articles and features, as well as a condensed book section. Poetry was featured, along with gift advice and star stories. The sister company Coronet Films was promoted in most issues as well. Articles on culture and the arts were mixed with adventure stories and social advice.

Coronet Films

Coronet Films were also produced by David Smart and the Esquire company. Primarily thought of as school films, its titles included "Fun of Being Thoughtful" (1950), "Dating: Do's and Don'ts" (1949), and "Where Does Our Meat Come From?" (1960).

Editors
Arnold Gingrich (1937)
Fritz Bamberger (1942)
 John Barkham (1951)

See also
Ken (magazine)
Pageant (magazine)
Reader's Digest
Sunshine (magazine)

References

External links

Coronet magazine records at Syracuse University]
WorldCat
The Genius of Passion: Esquire, Coronet and Ken Magazines.

Defunct magazines published in the United States
Defunct digests
Magazines established in 1936
Magazines disestablished in 1971
General interest digests
1936 establishments in the United States
Magazines published in Chicago